HMS Danae was the lead ship of the  cruisers (also known as the D class), serving with the Royal Navy between the world wars and with the Polish Navy during the latter part of World War II as ORP Conrad.

Service
Danae was laid down on 1 December 1916 in the Armstrong Whitworth Shipyard in Walker-on-Tyne and launched on 26 January 1918. The lead ship of her class, she was one of the fastest cruisers of her time.

In February 1920 she was attached to the 1st Light Cruiser Squadron of the Atlantic Fleet.

World cruise

In 1923 she was attached to the Special Service Squadron, a naval fleet created for propaganda purposes. The Squadron left Devonport on 27 November and headed for Freetown in Sierra Leone. Then the task force visited Cape Town, Port Elizabeth, East London and Durban, to where she arrived the last day of the year. The following day the Squadron left for Zanzibar, then visited Trincomalee, Singapore, Fremantle (February 1924), Albany, Adelaide, Melbourne, Hobart and Sydney, from where she left for Wellington in New Zealand. She left the port in May and on 16 May paid a short visit to Suva and Samara on Fiji, then to Honolulu (6 June), Victoria (25 June), Vancouver and then San Francisco (until 11 July). There the Squadron was split and the battlecruisers headed for Great Britain through the Panama Canal and various ports in South America, including British Guyana, Antilles and Jamaica.The light cruisers sailed south around South America visiting various ports on the way, Callao, Valparaiso and Talcahuano and through the Strait of Magallan. From there stopping at the Falkland Islands, Bahia Blanca, Buenos Aires, Montevideo and Rio de Janeiro, crossing the Atlantic Ocean with a final stop on the Cape Verde Islands before heading back for the Great Britain.

Transferred to the Mediterranean, between 1927 and 1929 Danae served as an escort of the 1st Cruiser Squadron, after which she was withdrawn to Great Britain for refurbishment and modernisation.

America and West Indies Station
In 1930 she returned to active service. Danae left Devonport on 20 August 1930, for Bermuda, by way of Halifax, Nova Scotia, towing the paddle-wheeled tug Sandboy (formerly named Strenuous). She towed the tug the entire distance, except for exiting and entering port. Danae and Sandboy reached Halifax on 2 September. On 6 September (when she was reported to belong to the Atlantic Squadron, but was actually joining the 8th Cruiser Squadron on the America and West Indies Station, based at the Royal Naval Dockyard in Bermuda), Danae left Sandboy at Halifax, in order to render aid to Santo Domingo, which had been struck by a hurricane, arriving there on 10 September (with the Royal Fleet Auxiliary oiler Serbol also arriving to render aid) and handing over to the Government of dictator Rafael Trujillo and the American Relief Committee all of the ship's medical supplies above what was retained in case of an emergency and all surplus food. Ships of the America and West Indies Station were generally scattered from Newfoundland to Cape Horn, and venturing into the Pacific Ocean, on cruises, but returned to Bermuda periodically where the fleet would gather for exercises. Danae under Captain Eric Richard Bent arrived at the Royal Naval Dockyard, where the fleet was to gather in October, on 22 September from Santo Domingo. Danae did not remain at Bermuda long before returning to Halifax for the Sandboy. On 17 October she left Halifax with the Sandboy in tow, and the two vessels arrived at Bermuda on 20 October.

In 1935, at the outbreak of the Second Sino-Japanese War, she escorted various evacuation convoys from Shanghai to Hong Kong and was fired at by the Japanese Navy.

Second World War
After completing her duties in the Far East, Danae was again moved to Great Britain and placed in reserve. Mobilized in July 1939, she was attached to the 9th Cruiser Squadron, initially operating in the South Atlantic and then the Indian Ocean from October. On 23 March 1940 she was attached to the Malaya Force, and took part in various patrols in the area of the Dutch East Indies and Singapore. On 24 February she arrived in Batavia and then went on to Colombo, from where she was withdrawn to Cape Town for refurbishment.

She returned to active service in July 1943, after 11 months in the shipyard. In March 1944 she returned to Great Britain and was attached to the 1st Cruiser Squadron. During the Invasion of Normandy, she performed ground support missions in the Sword Beach sector. In July the squadron moved to the area of Port en Bessin and Ouistreham, and returned to Great Britain in August. Danae was then withdrawn from active service, and used as a hulk in the port of Plymouth.

After the loss of her sister ship ORP Dragon, on 4 October Danae was leased to the Polish Navy. Danae was now manned mostly by the surviving part of Dragon'''s crew. and commanded by Cmdr. Stanisław Dzienisiewicz. She was refurbished in Southampton and then Chatham until 23 January 1945. Initially the ship was to be renamed to either "ORP Wilno" or "ORP Lwów", after the cities of Wilno (Vilnius) and Lwów (Lviv). This was seen as controversial because although the cities were part of Poland until after the war, they were at that time claimed by the Soviet Union, and the British authorities did not wish to offend the Soviets. It was decided to use the politically neutral name of ORP Conrad, after Józef Konrad Korzeniowski, better known under his English pen name of Joseph Conrad. She left the shipyard only on 30 May, three weeks after war in Europe ended. Attached to the 29th Destroyer Flotilla (comprising ,  and ), she was briefly stationed in the port of Wilhelmshaven, the main base of the Kriegsmarine, recently captured by the Polish 1st Armoured Division.

Until the end of 1945 she served as a transport ship, transporting Polish Red Cross help to Norway and Denmark. In January of the following year she returned to Rosyth for good. On 8 March 1946 the ships were decommissioned from the Home Fleet and the Polish crews began preparing to hand them back to the British. By August the ship's crew was reduced by 50%, and on 28 September she was returned to the Royal Navy. Renamed back to Danae'' she was taken over by the Care & Maintenance Party and moved to Falmouth. On 22 January 1948 she was sold to Thos. W. Ward, and starting 27 March 1948 was scrapped in the Vickers Armstrong shipyard in Barrow-in-Furness.

References

Bibliography

External links
 Photograph of HMS Danae and HMS Hood "entering Fremantle Harbour" in collection taken by Marjory Ridley, digitized by Bunbury Museum & Heritage Centre June 2019.

External links 

 D class cruisers
 Danae class light cruisers
 Pictures of HMS Danae / ORP Conrad
 Details and history of the Danae class cruisers (in Polish)
 Silhouette of ORP Dragon and ORP Conrad
 Drawings of ORP Conrad
 ORP Conrad after refit in 1943

 

Danae-class cruisers of the Royal Navy
Ships built on the River Tyne
1918 ships
World War I cruisers of the United Kingdom
World War II cruisers of the United Kingdom
Danae-class cruisers of the Polish Navy
World War II cruisers of Poland
Ships built by Armstrong Whitworth